is a Japanese manga series by Mayu Sakai, that was serialized in Shueisha's shōjo manga magazine Ribon from September 2011 to August 2015. It has been collected in ten tankōbon volumes. An anime adaptation aired from January 14 to January 28, 2014, as a segment on TV Tokyo's children's television series Oha Star.

Characters

Media

Manga

References

External links

Anime series based on manga
Romantic comedy anime and manga
Shōjo manga
Shueisha franchises
Shueisha manga
TV Tokyo original programming